Rəfədinli or Rafadely or Rafadinli may refer to:
Aşağı Rəfədinli, Azerbaijan
Yuxarı Rəfədinli, Azerbaijan